Ben Olan (March 31, 1923 – November 11, 2019) was a sports author and journalist. A former sports writer for the New York Associated Press, he won the Elmer Ferguson Memorial Award in 1987 and is a member of the media section of the Hockey Hall of Fame. He joined the Associated Press in 1952 as a sports writer, covering hockey, and retired after 51 years in the profession, around 2003.

References

1923 births
2019 deaths
American sportswriters
Elmer Ferguson Award winners
American sports journalists